Parish Church of Our Lady of Loreto is a Roman Catholic neo-gothic parish church located in the village of Għajnsielem on the island of Gozo, Malta.

History
New plans were drawn by Ugo Mallia to build a new parish church to replace the old parish church which became too small for the growing population. The foundation stone of the church was laid on 14 September 1924. The church was not completed until the mid 1970s due to a number of interruptions mainly WWII and two accidents in which the master mason broke his legs. Delays resumed when architect Mallia refrained from further work. Consequently plans were transferred to architect Guze D'Amato. When he died another architect took over. It was only on 27 August 1978 that the church was blessed and consecrated 11 years later on August 18, 1989.

References

1924 establishments in Malta
20th-century Roman Catholic church buildings in Malta
Għajnsielem
Gothic Revival church buildings in Malta
National Inventory of the Cultural Property of the Maltese Islands